Seah Leng Chye, also known as Seah Ling Chai, was the son of Kapitan Seah Tee Heng, and one of the members of the Johor Education Department since 1887. He had taken over his father's kangchu concessions, pepper and gambier business, and revenue farms. 

In addition, he held shares to eight rivers in his own right and was the manager of the Kongkek (Pepper and Gambier Society of Singapore). Seah was therefore the most prominent towkay (landlord) in Johor.

See also
Kangchu system
List of Kapitan Cina

References

External links
 http://www.sxl.org.my/2010-11-10-02-09-02/791-2010-11-10-02-37-31?start=2
 http://chsbp.net.my/show.php?contentid=8921

People from Johor Bahru
Malaysian people of Chinese descent